Marble Elementary School may refer to the school in:

East Lansing Public Schools
Cherokee County Schools (North Carolina)